The 2014–15 Polish Basketball League – for sponsorship reasons the Tauron Basket Liga – was the 81st season of the highest professional basketball tier in Poland and the 19th since the foundation of the Polish Basketball League.

The league champion qualified for the 2015–16 Euroleague regular season.

Teams

Notes
 Promoted to the highest tier.
 Teams that received wild card invitations from the league.

Regular season

Results

Playoffs

Stelmet Zielona Góra 2014–15 PLK Champions
 2 Robinson
 4 Pelka
 5 Cel
 8 Troutman
 9 Zywert
 13 Chanas
 14 Hosley
 20 Kucharek
 24 Lalic
 34 Hrycaniuk
 35 Zamojski
 55 Koszarek
 Head coach: Filipovski

Statistical leaders

Points

Rebounds

Assists

Awards

MVP:  Damian Kulig – PGE Turów Zgorzelec 
Finals MVP:  Quinton Hosley – Stelmet Zielona Góra
Best Defender:  Quinton Hosley – Stelmet Zielona Góra
Best Coach:  Wojciech Kamiński – Rosa Radom
Best Polish Player:  Damian Kulig – PGE Turów Zgorzelec 

All-PLK Team:
 Quinton Hosley – Stelmet Zielona Góra
 Jerel Blassingame – Energa Czarni Słupsk
 Karol Gruszecki – Energa Czarni Słupsk
 Aaron Cel – Stelmet Zielona Góra
 Damian Kulig – PGE Turów Zgorzelec

Polish clubs in European competitions

References

External links
Polska Liga Koszykówki - Official Site 
Polish League at Eurobasket.com

Polish Basketball League seasons
Polish
Lea